Panorama is the main news program on TVP2. The main edition is broadcast at 18:00 every day. This program was created in 1987 as Panorama Dnia, during Poland's communist rule. In 1991 Panorama Dnia was changed into Panorama. In 2010, Panorama watched by an average of 1.5 million Poles.

Since 21 July 2016, the editor-in-chief of Panorama is Aneta Kołodziej.

In December 2020, the 18:00 main edition was shortened from 25 minutes to 20 minutes to accommodate Jeopardy!, which airs at 18:20.  In September 2022, with Jeopardy! airing seven days a week, the 18:00 main edition on weekends was reduced also to 20 minutes.

Current presenters

Main editions 
 Marta Kielczyk (since 1999)
 Tomasz Wolny (since 2014)
 Karol Gnat (since 2016)

Other editions 
 Magdalena Stankiewicz (since 2016)
 Joanna Bukowska-Kasprzak (2005-2006, since 2016)
 Tomasz Marciniuk (since 2017)
 Adam Krzykowski (since 2010)
 Marta Piasecka (since 2018)

Editions 

8:50 am - flash in the program Pytanie na Śniadanie, Monday to Friday

10:35 - flash in the program Pytanie na Śniadanie on Saturdays

11:00 am - morning edition, Monday to Friday (except holidays)

18:00 - main release, daily

Additional programs:

In addition, the Weather is broadcast in the Pytanie na Śniadanie (at 9:40 am and 10:25 am)

After the 18:00 release:

Weather (on weekends at 6:20 pm), hosted by Monika Andrzejczak, Waldemar Dolecki, Celestyna Grzebyta, Marzena Kawa, Mariusz Kłopecki, Aleksandra Kostka, Ziemowit Pędziwiatr and Marzena Słupkowska

Panorama Opinii (from Monday to Friday at 18:20), journalistic program broadcast on TVP Info.

Old Editions 

7:00 a.m. - Monday to Saturday (September 5, 1994 to June 21, 1997)

7:30 a.m. - Monday to Saturday (September 2, 1991 to August 29, 1992 and June 28, 1993 to September 3, 1994)

8:00 a.m. - Monday to Saturday (August 31, 1992 to June 26, 1993)
11:00 - Monday to Friday (April 5, 1993 to April 29, 1994)

1:00 p.m. - from Monday to Friday, in the 90s expanded with the Panorama gospodarki (from April 5, 1993 to December 30, 2005)

4:00 p.m. - Monday to Friday (June 28, 1993 to April 6, 2007), in the 21st century with sign language; reprint as Panorama świat (January 4, 2011 to June 10, 2011); transformation into Panorama Kraj (from June 13, 2011 to February 28, 2017), periodic shifts to earlier hours: 3:30 p.m. - from March 3, 2014 to June 27, 2014, 3:40 p.m. - November 9, 2015 to February 28, 2017, 3:45 p.m. - from September 6, 2011 to December 30, 2011 and from September 3, 2012 to February 28, 2014, 3:50 p.m. - from August 31, 2015 to November 6, 2015

4:30 p.m. - everyday (from September 2, 1991 to June 27, 1993)

6:00 p.m. - everyday (from June 28, 1993 to September 5, 1999)

6:30 p.m. - daily (April 5, 1993 to June 25, 1993, September 6, 1999 to January 1, 2007, September 3, 2007 to June 21, 2009)

6:45 p.m. - everyday (from January 2, 2007 to September 2, 2007)

9:00 p.m. - daily (from September 2, 1991 to June 22, 1997, from September 6, 1999 to June 24, 2001, from September 3, 2001 to May 29, 2002)

9:30 p.m. - everyday (from September 3, 2007 to December 31, 2007)

10:00 p.m. - daily (from June 23, 1997 to September 5, 1999, from June 25, 2001 to September 2, 2001, from May 30, 2002 to September 2, 2006, from January 1, 2007 to September 2, 2007)

10:30 p.m. - everyday (from September 3, 2006 to December 31, 2006)

10:45 p.m. - daily (from June 22, 2009 to February 28, 2010)

12:00 a.m. - daily (September 2, 1991 to June 22, 1997, March 2, 2008 to August 31, 2008)

12:30 a.m. - daily (from September 1, 2008 to March 1, 2009)

10:30 p.m.–12:30 a.m. - daily (from January 1, 2008 to March 1, 2008)

See also 
 Wiadomości
 Teleexpress

References

External links 
 

Polish television shows
1991 Polish television series debuts
Polish television news shows
1990s Polish television series
2000s Polish television series
2010s Polish television series
2020s Polish television series
Telewizja Polska original programming